Pseudexentera costomaculana is a species of moth of the family Tortricidae. It is found in North America (including Massachusetts, New York, North Carolina, South Carolina, West Virginia, Virginia, Connecticut, Maryland, Michigan, Mississippi, New Hampshire, Nova Scotia and Pennsylvania).

The wingspan is about 14 mm.

The larvae feed on Hamamelis virginiana.

References

External links
mothphotographersgroup

Moths described in 1860
Eucosmini